Lemyra sordidescens is a moth of the family Erebidae. It was described by George Hampson in 1901. It is found in India (Sikkim, Assam) and Myanmar.

References

 

sordidescens
Moths described in 1901